Stadio Comunale is Italian for "municipal stadium", and may refer to a main stadium in many towns in Italy and Italian Switzerland.  In particular:

Italy
Stadio Tommaso Fattori, L'Aquila
Stadio Città di Arezzo, Arezzo
Stadio Renato Dall'Ara, Bologna
Stadio Sant'Elia, Cagliari
Stadio Comunale (Chiavari)
Stadio Artemio Franchi (Florence)
Stadio Luigi Ferraris, Genoa
Stadio Olimpico Comunale, Grosseto
Nuovo Stadio Comunale (Lumezzane)
Stadio Comunale Giovanni Celeste, Messina
Stadio Marcello Melani, Pistoia
Stadio Comunale (Pizzighettone)
Stadio Comunale Mario Battaglini, Rovigo
Stadio Comunale (Teramo)
Stadio Olimpico Grande Torino, Turin
Stadio Comunale di Monigo, Treviso
Stadio Comunale, Mogliano Veneto

Switzerland
Stadio Comunale Bellinzona
Stadio Comunale (Chiasso)
Stadio del Lido, Locarno

See also
:Category:Sports venues in Italy
Municipal Stadium (disambiguation)
Stade Municipal (disambiguation)
Estadio Municipal (disambiguation)